Jennifer Muriel Van Den Heever (born 21 January 1962) is a Namibian politician. She currently serves as chief whip of the official opposition, the Popular Democratic Movement in the parliament of Namibia. She was elected to parliament in 2014 and has served on various parliamentary committees.

Political career and early life
van den Heever was born in South West Africa in 1962. She obtained her standard 10 in 1979 and is currently a member of the Parliamentary Standing Committees on Human Resources and Community Development.

References

Living people
1962 births
21st-century Namibian women politicians
21st-century Namibian politicians
Popular Democratic Movement politicians